Diane Therrien (born 1985 or 1986) is a Canadian politician who served as the 62nd mayor of Peterborough from 2018 to 2022. She was elected in the 2018 Ontario municipal elections. Prior to her mayoral election, she was a city councillor for Ward 3 (Town Ward) from 2014 to 2018.

Prior to her political career, Therrien worked for Ontario's Ministry of Aboriginal Affairs and for the Peterborough Poverty Reduction Network.

Early life and education 
Therrien was born in Mississauga and started studying History and Peace Studies at McMaster University when she was 17-years-old. After getting a bachelor's degree from McMaster University, she obtained her master's degree Trent University, where she studied canadian indigenous issues.

Career 
After graduation, Therrien worked at the Ministry of Aboriginal Affairs in Toronto, and for three years as a facilitator of community education at the Peterborough Poverty Reduction Network.

Prior to her mayoral election, she was a city councillor for Ward 3 (Town Ward) from 2014 to 2018.

Therrien was elected as mayor of Peterborough in the 2018 Ontario municipal elections. Therrien is the third woman to be mayor of the city. 

On August 13, 2019, Peterborough City Council unanimously passed a by-law to eliminate camping in City Parks. Therrien announced that she would not allow the police to enforce the bylaws as written.  1,751 members of the local community signed a petition requesting the removal of Tent City, a homeless encampment. The total expense for police patrols of the area in 2019 was more than $86,000. On February 14, 2022, Therrien asked Deputy Mayor Andrew Beamer to serve as acting mayor while she took a leave of absence for health reasons.

In 2021, Therrien announced she would not run for re-election. She had been rumoured to run for the Ontario New Democratic Party in the 2022 Ontario general election, but decided to not run. In 2022, Therrien was involved in a minor controversy after using the phrase "fuck off, you fuckwads." in response to supporters of QAnon conspiracy theorist Romana Didulo attempting to detain members of the city's police force.

Her mayoral term ended in 2022.

References

External links
  City of Peterborough City Council and Mayor
 Official site, copy archived August 11, 2020
 Diane Therrien - Twitter

1980s births
Living people
Mayors of Peterborough, Ontario
McMaster University alumni
Politicians from Mississauga
Trent University alumni
Women mayors of places in Ontario
Year of birth missing (living people)